Lake George (Nova Scotia)  is a lake of Kings County, in Nova Scotia, Canada.

There is a Provincial Park beach area at the south end of the lake.

See also
 List of lakes in Nova Scotia
 Lake George, Kings County, Nova Scotia
 Royal eponyms in Canada

References
 National Resources Canada
 Kings County Lakes: Lake George Photographs and maps

Footnotes

George K